Savannakhet Football Club (Laos  ສະໂມສອນບານເຕະແຂວງສະຫວັນນະເຂດ ) is a Laos professional football club based in Savannakhet Province, a city located in the South  part of Laos. The club currently plays in Lao League.

Sponsors

External links
 Weltfussballarch

References

Football clubs in Laos
Savannakhet